East Basin is an unincorporated area and census-designated place (CDP) in Summit County, Utah, United States. It was first listed as a CDP prior to the 2020 census.

It is in the southwest part of the county, bordered to the northwest by Silver Summit and to the southwest by Snyderville. Interstate 80 forms the northwest border of the CDP; the highway leads northeast  to Coalville and west  to Salt Lake City. U.S. Routes 40 and U.S. Route 189 turn south from I-80 at Silver Creek Junction along the northwest edge of the CDP; the U.S. highways lead south  to Heber City.

East Basin is drained by Silver Creek, which flows north to the Weber River, carving a canyon followed by Interstate 80.

Education
Different portions of the CDP are in the North Summit School District, the Park City School District, and the South Summit School District. Park City High School is the Park City district's comprehensive high school.

References 

Populated places in Summit County, Utah
Census-designated places in Summit County, Utah
Census-designated places in Utah